The McAuliffe-Shepard Discovery Center is a science museum located in Concord, New Hampshire, United States, next door to the NHTI campus. The museum is dedicated to Christa McAuliffe, the Concord High School social studies teacher selected by NASA out of over 11,000 applicants to be the first teacher in space, and Alan Shepard, the Derry, New Hampshire, native and Navy test pilot who became the first American in space and one of only twelve human beings to walk on the Moon. The Discovery Center's stated mission is to inspire new generations to explore space, through engaging, artful, and entertaining activities focused on astronomy, aviation, Earth and space science.

The  museum offers  of interactive science and engineering exhibits, outdoor exhibits including a full-sized replica of a Mercury-Redstone rocket, a full-dome digital planetarium, an observatory, science store, café, portable digital planetarium and a full complement of on- and off-site educational programs.

History
The McAuliffe-Shepard Discovery Center began as a stand-alone planetarium serving as the official State of New Hampshire memorial to Christa McAuliffe, opening in June 1990 as the Christa McAuliffe Planetarium. In 2001 it became the official state memorial to Admiral Alan Shepard as well, after his death in 1998. It is one of two public planetaria in northern New England, along with the Lyman Spitzer Jr. Planetarium in St. Johnsbury, Vermont.

In 2009, the organization more than quadrupled in size when it added a science museum focused on astronomy, aviation, Earth and space science; it was renamed the McAuliffe-Shepard Discovery Center. The grand opening was on March 6, 2009.

After 22 years as a State of New Hampshire agency, on January 1, 2013, the McAuliffe-Shepard Discovery Center separated from the state and became a private sector nonprofit operation. The State of New Hampshire retained ownership of the facility and grounds, but engaged in a long-term lease with the new nonprofit operator, the McAuliffe-Shepard Discovery Center Corporation.

In 2019, the Discovery Center served as one of the primary settings of the independent film First Signal produced by New England-based company The Ashton Times.

Programs
The McAuliffe-Shepard Discovery Center's programs include the statewide high school "Astronomy Bowl" competition, annual "Aerospacefest" aerospace festival in the spring, stargazing with the New Hampshire Astronomical Society along with a public science talk and planetarium show the first Friday of every month, a "teen night series" the second Friday night each month, an annual science symposium for educators the last week of June, an annual New Hampshire Space Grant Internship, homeschool and teacher workshops, toddler science workshops and summer camps.

Exhibits
The Discovery Center's exhibits include a 1956 XF8U-2 jet on loan from the National Naval Aviation Museum, 1:1 scale models of the Mercury capsule inside and Mercury-Redstone outside, exhibits on planetary science, lunar exploration, Space Shuttle exhibits including a simulator and scale models, aviation, weather, science fiction toys and memorabilia including the suit worn by Grace Lee Whitney in the 1979 film Star Trek: The Motion Picture, and chairs from Geordi La Forge's room in Star Trek: The Next Generation; in addition, the Discovery Center brings in three traveling exhibits annually on science and engineering.

The McAuliffe-Shepard Discovery Center operates NASA's Educator Resource Center in New Hampshire and is a New Hampshire Space Grant institution.

References

External links

McAuliffe-Shepard Discovery Center
Photo of the plaque at the base of the Mercury-Redstone rocket replica

Planetaria in the United States
Museums in Merrimack County, New Hampshire
Buildings and structures in Concord, New Hampshire
Science museums in New Hampshire
Aerospace museums in New Hampshire
Tourist attractions in Concord, New Hampshire
Association of Science-Technology Centers member institutions
Alan Shepard
Museums established in 1990
1990 establishments in New Hampshire